Hawthorn Community Consolidated School District 73 is located in Vernon Hills, Illinois, approximately 35 miles northwest of Chicago. It has approximately 3,763 students (as of 2007) in grades Pre-Kindergarten through 8th grade in six schools spread across two campuses, the North Campus and the T.G. Oakson Campus.

Schools at North Campus
 Hawthorn Elementary School North, opened in 1978
 Hawthorn Townline Elementary School, opened in 2005
 John Powers Center for the Hearing Impaired, part of the Special Education District of Lake County
 Hawthorn Middle School North - Opened in 1975 and originally housing Grades 6–8. From 1999 to 2005 it was known as Hawthorn Middle School and educated  grades 5–6.  Prior to that, it was known as Hawthorn Junior High School and housed grades 7–8, with 6th graders attending Half Day Middle School in unincorporated Prairie View.

Schools at Oakson Campus
 Hawthorn Aspen Elementary School, opened in 1999
 Hawthorn Elementary School South, opened in 1938
 Hawthorn Middle School South - Opened in 1999 as the new Hawthorn Junior High School, housing all 7th and 8th grade students in the district. In 2005, the school became known as Hawthorn Middle School South and opened its doors to 6th, 7th, and 8th grade students living South of IL Rt. 60.

Both Hawthorn Aspen Elementary School and Hawthorn Townline Elementary school currently offer a dual-language program in only Spanish. They are optional schools within the district. Children who do not attend these will not receive language learning until 7th grade.  Children who do attend these schools will be given an advanced Spanish course in 6th grade instead of a Writing course.

External links 
Hawthorn School District 73 Web Site

Cited 

School districts in Lake County, Illinois
Vernon Hills, Illinois